This is a list of people awarded the title Hero of the Soviet Union who were of Tajik ethnicity. It does not include non-Tajik residents of the Tajik SSR who were awarded the title.

 Domullo Azizov ru
 Nabi Akramov ru
 Safar Amirshoev ru
 Fatulla Ahmedov ru
 Vildan Habiev ru
 Alim Hakimov ru
 Ismail Hamzaliev ru
 Negmat Karabaev ru
 Haidar Kasimov ru
 Hozi Kinzhaev ru
 Tohtasin Mirzaev ru
 Tuichi Nazarov ru
 Azim Rakhimov ru
 Rakhimbai Rakhmatov ru
 Amirali Saidbekov ru
 Irgash Sharipov ru
 Ismat Sharipov ru
 Saidqul Turdyev ru

References 

 
 Russian Ministry of Defence Database «Подвиг Народа в Великой Отечественной войне 1941—1945 гг.» [Feat of the People in the Great Patriotic War 1941-1945] (in Russian).

Heroes of the Soviet Union lists